Kill Jill

 "Kill Jill", an episode of the American television drama series Nikita
 "Kill Jill", a song by Big Boi from the album Boomiverse